Swimming at the 13th Games of the Small States of Europe was held June 2–5, 2009 at the Limassol Swimming Pool in Limassol, Cyprus. The competition featured 32 events, swum in a long course (50 m) pool. Events for both sexes, by stroke, were:
freestyle: 50, 100, 200, 400, 800 (women only), and 1500 (men only);
backstroke: 100 and 200;
breaststroke: 100 and 200;
butterfly: 100 and 200;
individual medley (I.M.): 200 and 400;
relays: 4×100 free, 4×200 free, and 4×100 medley

Of note about the competition: every women's Games record was bettered, except one (the 200 fly); and all eight participating countries at the Games had swimmers: Andorra, Cyprus, Iceland, Liechtenstein, Luxembourg, Malta (women only), Monaco and San Marino.

Competition schedule

Results

Men

Women

Medal standings

Note:  was the only country not to medal in Swimming.

References

Games of the Small States of Europe
2009 Games of the Small States of Europe
2009